The Wendling Bridge is a covered bridge in Lane County in the U.S. state of Oregon. The  Howe truss structure carries Wendling Road over Mill Creek in the unincorporated community of Wendling. Built in 1938, the bridge was added to the National Register of Historic Places in 1979.

Lane County built four covered bridges, including the Wendling Bridge, in 1936. The others are the Pengra, Goodpasture Bridge, and Earnest bridges. A. C. Striker was then the county bridge superintendent.

Notable features of the bridge include semi-elliptical portal arches and ribbon openings at the eaves. The structure was named for George X. Wendling, who established a post office nearby in the 1890s.

See also
 List of bridges on the National Register of Historic Places in Oregon
 National Register of Historic Places listings in Lane County, Oregon

References

External links
 

1938 establishments in Oregon
Bridges completed in 1938
Covered bridges on the National Register of Historic Places in Oregon
Covered bridges in Lane County, Oregon
National Register of Historic Places in Lane County, Oregon
Road bridges on the National Register of Historic Places in Oregon
Wooden bridges in Oregon
Howe truss bridges in the United States